The wheelchair rugby competition at the 2022 World Games took place in July 2022, in Birmingham, Alabama in United States.
Originally scheduled to take place in July 2021, the Games were rescheduled for July 2022 as a result of the 2020 Summer Olympics and Paralympics postponement due to the COVID-19 pandemic.
Wheelchair rugby competition made its debut as invitational sport of The World Games programme and also was the first paralympic sport at the World Games program. As happening at the Paralympics, wheelchair rugby is a mixed team sport for male and female quadriplegic athletes.

Participating nations

Medal table

Medalists

References

External links
 The World Games 2022
 International Wheelchair Rugby Federation
 Results book

 
2022 World Games